Earnest Lee Hudson Jr. (born September 16, 1965, in Benton Harbor, Michigan) is an American actor, author, poet, and film producer. In October 2021, he was affirmed as Togbui Kpogo Afenya I, an Ewe Chief in Frankadua, in the Eastern Region of Ghana Ghana, near the Volta. He currently serves as President of the Center for Ewe Culture, a non-profit which facilitates family reunification between African DNA carriers and their Continental DNA matches.

Early life and education 
Togbui's (Earnest) earliest creative influence was Detroit’s famed “Concept East,” of which his father was a contributing playwright/actor, with Togbui’s own formal training beginning at Los Angeles’ InnerCity Cultural Center (ICCC), as one of the founding participants in their Children’s Repertory Company. As a young adult, he was a featured performer in the 1984 Summer Olympics Closing Ceremonies, and continued to pursue performance excellence by earning the 1989 National Collegiate Gold Medal Champion title in Oral Forensics, attaining the rank of 5th Degree Black Belt, and obtaining a M.Sc. in Exercise Science. In true artistic fashion, Togbui continues to professionally perform and produce, expanding his skills-set as a television series regular on the HBO’s, “OZ,” the release of the contemplative book, “Freestyle Prophecies & Sacred Ciphers,” the feature film, “The Karma Club,” and is a contributing author in Craig Duswalt’s 2021 released “1001 Ways to Rock Your Life.” His 15+ year corporate career in Talent Management has allowed him to perfect his skills of organizational leadership and corporate training.

Career 
Inspired by his mother’s work as an African Studies Professor at Cal State Long Beach under Dr. Maulana Karenga, Togbui began a serious study of genealogy when members of his family successfully matched DNA with persons from Nigeria and Ghana, who shared a common Ancestor most likely enslaved during Europe’s colonization of the African Continent. As much of the world’s common social perception is that it would be near-impossible to find such family, or to learn anything specific about one’s Continental origins beyond cultural generalities, Togbui immediately recognized the opportunity to shatter a social myth, and committed to reconnecting, reconciling, and reuniting with as many of his Continental DNA matched families as possible. In 2021, Togbui made an Ancestral Return to Ghana, meeting with 3 branches of his paternal DNA tree. Arriving in Ghana as Earnest, his Ewe family performed traditional divination on his behalf and learned that he was the reincarnation of his Ancestral Great Grandfather, Regent Kpogo I of Frankadua, Eastern Region Ghana. The current Regent of Frankadua, together with Frankadua’s Queen Mother and the Paramount Chief of Akwamu, H.R.H. Odeneho Kwafo Akoto III, affirmed Earnest as “Kpogo Afenya I,” later honoring him as a leader among his people by bestowing the title “Togbui” (Grandpa or King) upon him. Today, Togbui operates the non-profit Center for Ewe Culture to revitalize the town of Frankadua, Ghana, and to educate everyone about the importance of DNA testing, particularly among those who carry African DNA.

Togbui is a Lifetime Member of the high I.Q. group American Mensa, active in various charitable organizations, and continues to train corporate executives. He currently resides in New York.

In addition to his acting, Hudson is a published author of poetry.

Filmography

Film

Television

Voice Over

Books

References

External links

ErnieHudsonJr.com (Archived June 14, 2018)

1965 births
Living people
African-American male actors
American male film actors
American male television actors
Michigan State University alumni
People from Benton Harbor, Michigan
21st-century African-American people
20th-century African-American people